Tubular Bells 2003 is the 22nd studio album by English musician Mike Oldfield, released on 27 May 2003 by Warner Music Spain. It is a digital re-recording of his 1973 album Tubular Bells, released almost 30 years earlier. To date, this is the most recent album in the Tubular Bells series.

Background 
In 2003, the re-recording rights to Oldfield's debut album Tubular Bells returned to him, which brought about the idea to re-record it to commemorate the 30th anniversary of the original. He had always been uncomfortable with the original recording because he had only a few weeks to record it and the technology at the time was unable to cope with all of his requirements. As a result, mistakes could not be fixed and some instruments were out of tune on the 1973 release. Due to contractual reasons no re-recordings were allowed for 25 years after the original release. The release of Tubular Bells 2003 took place in the year when Oldfield celebrated his 50th birthday and the 30th anniversary of the original version.

To remain faithful to the original album, Oldfield obtained a copy of the original 16 track tape, from Richard Barrie of Air Studios; this multitrack was then recorded into Digidesign Pro Tools. There were a few parts of the multitrack recording missing however; this included parts of the "Finale", "Caveman" and "The Sailors Hornpipe" sections. These original tracks were then moved into Emagic Logic, where Oldfield used MIDI to create a tempo and time signature map; some sections of the original album had not been in time. A guide MIDI keyboard was laid on top, for which Oldfield usually used some Roland Strings. The first instrument to be recorded was the Glockenspiel at the beginning of Part One's "Introduction", and the final part to be recorded was the "Caveman" vocal track.

The album was released in four versions: a CD in Europe, a CD in North America, and a DVD-Audio edition. The copy protection on the CDs caused many complaints about playback difficulties, including claims of damage to CD and DVD players.

Due to the extensive use of digital technology, Tubular Bells 2003 has a more synthesised and brighter sound than the original. Because of the death of Vivian Stanshall, who was the original master of ceremonies on the 1973 release, Oldfield had actor John Cleese introduce the instruments in the "Finale" part.

A CD audio/DVD Video-audio 5.1, was released in Spain and México.

There is a facetious warning inside the cover of CD: "This stereo record can still not be played on old tin boxes no matter what they are fitted with. If you are in possession of such equipment please hand it into the nearest police station". This warning references a similar note, without the word "still", from the original album.

Promo single 

A video and Spanish promo single were produced for a remix version of the Tubular Bells "Introduction" theme, entitled "Introduction 2003".  Released as a single in Spain on 24 April 2003, it features drums and more synthesized instruments, and a conceptual video was also produced. This video is available on the DVD Audio version of Tubular Bells 2003.

The second publicly released MusicVR game, Maestro, used various extracts from Tubular Bells 2003.

Personnel 
Performers
 Mike Oldfield – acoustic and electric guitars, electric bass, accordion, Steinway grand pianos, Farfisa, Lowrey & Hammond organs, synthesizers, glockenspiel, timpani, cymbals, tambourine, triangle, tubular bells, programming, producer
 John Cleese – master of ceremonies
 Sally Oldfield – background vocals

Non-performers
 Ben Darlow – engineer
 Steve Bedford – new Tubular Bell image
 Trevor Key – original Tubular Bell image
 Andy Earl – inner cover photo
 e-xentric thinking – design
 Oldfield Music Overseas Ltd. / EMI Publishing Ltd – publishing

Track listing

CD 
Part one
 "Introduction" – 5:52
 "Fast Guitars" – 1:04
 "Basses" – 0:46
 "Latin" – 2:18
 "A Minor Tune" – 1:21
 "Blues" – 2:40
 "Thrash" – 0:44
 "Jazz" – 0:48
 "Ghost Bells" – 0:30
 "Russian" – 0:44
 "Finale" – 8:32 (featuring John Cleese)

Part two
  "Harmonics" – 5:12
 "Peace" – 3:30
 "Bagpipe Guitars" – 3:08
 "Caveman" – 4:33
 "Ambient Guitars" – 5:10
 "The Sailor's Hornpipe" – 1:46 (Traditional arrangement)

Bonus DVD 
 Disc 2 – Total Time 11:22
 "Introduction" – 5:51
 "Fast Guitars" – 1:04
 "Basses" – 0:46
 "Introduction 2003" 'The video' – 3:41

DVD-Audio bonus material 
The DVD-Audio edition includes the demos Oldfield recorded in his flat in 1971 and two excerpts from other Oldfield DVD releases.

1971 Demos
 "Tubular Bells Long" – 22:57
 "Caveman Lead-In" – 2:46
 "Caveman" – 5:05
 "Peace Demo A" – 7:00
 "Peace Demo B" – 4:18

Live Excerpts
 "Sentinel" – from Tubular Bells II – Live at Edinburgh Castle 1992 – 8:06
 "Far Above the Clouds" – from Tubular Bells III – Live at Horseguards Parade, London 1998 – 4:40

Equipment

Hardware
Mixing desk
 AMS Neve Capricorn (V2.85.003 & V2.91.007)
Computers
 Apple Macintosh computers
 G4 466Mhz OS9.1, 1Gb Ram – Logic Audio Platinum 4.8.1 and Pro Tools
 G4 1000Mhz OS9.2 – Logic 5.3.0 and Pro Tools 5.3.1
 Powerbook 5300
 Pro Tools Mix Plus card X2
 4 Pro Tools 24-bit 888s
 Motu 828
Plug-ins
 Amp Farm
 Focusrite EQ and Compression
Outboard effects
 TC Electronic M5000
 Eventide DSP 4000
 Lexicon 300
 Yamaha SPX 1000
 UREI 1176 & 1178
 Belcaman C-102
 5 NEVE 1073 Mic Amps and EQ
 Manor Module (Mic Amp, EQ and Compressor from the original Manor console)
Microphones
 Brüel & Kjær 4011
 Brüel & Kjær 4040 (Serial no. 001)
 AKG C12
 Shure SM57
 Neuman U67
 Neuman M249
 Beyer Dynamic M160
 BSS DI Box

Instruments 
Electric guitars
 Fender Telecaster 1965
 Fender Stratocaster 1963 (listed as 1965) (Pink)
 PRS McCarty Semi-Acoustic
 PRS Signature (through Roland GP8)
 PRS Signature (through Roland VG8)
 Wal bass
 Fender Twin Reverb Amplifier
 Mesa Boogie Amplifier
Acoustic guitars
 Ramirez Class 1A Flamenco 1974
 Ramirez Class 1A Flamenco 1975
 Martin Steel String Acoustic
 Taylor K22 Acoustic Guitar 1985
 Ovation Adamas
 MJV Mandolin
Pianos and organs
 Steinway 8 ft 1920s, frame rebuilt
 Steinway 6 ft 1920s Model L
 Lowery Organ
 Farfisa Organ
 Accordion
Keyboards
 Roland JV880
 Roland XP50
 Roland JV2080
 Roland JD990
 Nord Lead
 Korg Trinity
 Boss Dr. Rhythm
 Akai S6000
Soft synths
 Emagic EXS24
 Emagic ES1
 Emagic EVP88
 Native Instruments Pro-52
Percussion
 Glockenspiel
 Tambourine
 Triangle
 Cymbals
 Timpani
 Tubular bells

Charts

Release details

References

External links 
 Mike Oldfield Discography – Tubular Bells 2003 at Tubular.net
 

2003 remix albums
Mike Oldfield albums
Warner Music Group albums